De Grote Slijmfilm is a 2020 Dutch film directed by Hans Somers. The film won the Golden Film award after having sold 100,000 tickets. It was both the best visited Dutch children's film and the fourth highest-grossing Dutch film of 2020. It was also the fifth best visited Dutch film of 2020.

In January 2021, the sequel De Nog Grotere Slijmfilm was announced.

References

External links 
 

2020 films
Dutch adventure films
Dutch children's films
2020s Dutch-language films